Smooth Sailin' is the seventh studio album by American country music artist T. G. Sheppard. It was released in 1980 via Warner Bros. and Curb Records. The album includes the singles "Smooth Sailin', "Do You Wanna Go to Heaven", and "I Feel Like Loving You Again".

Track listing

Chart performance

References

1980 albums
T. G. Sheppard albums
Warner Records albums
Curb Records albums